Tea Table Key also known as "Terra's Key" is an island in the upper Florida Keys.

It is located on U.S. 1 at mile marker 79.

All of the key is within the Villages of Islamorada as of November 4, 1997, when it was incorporated.

The island lies to the southwest of Upper Matecumbe Key, and to the northeast of Lower Matecumbe Key.

There is a small private beach on the island the entrance is to a private road that leads to a private residence.

The island hosted U.S. naval operations during the Seminole Wars and was taken over in an attack by indigenous tribes.

References

Islands of the Florida Keys
Islands of Monroe County, Florida
Beaches of Monroe County, Florida
Beaches of Florida
Islands of Florida